Jonathan Wallace House is a historic home located at Potsdam in St. Lawrence County, New York.  It was built in 1828 and is a two-story, five-bay, hipped-roof Federal style residence with a two-story rear wing built about 1846.  The main block and wing are constructed of red Potsdam Sandstone in the slab and binder style.

It was listed on the National Register of Historic Places in 2003.

References

Houses on the National Register of Historic Places in New York (state)
Federal architecture in New York (state)
Houses completed in 1828
Houses in St. Lawrence County, New York
Sandstone houses in the United States
National Register of Historic Places in St. Lawrence County, New York